The Mille Lacs Band of Ojibwe, also known as the Mille Lacs Band of Chippewa Indians, is a federally recognized American Indian tribe located in east-central Minnesota.  The Band has 4,302 members as of 2012.  Its homeland is the Mille Lacs Indian Reservation, consisting of District I (near Onamia), District II (near McGregor), District IIa (near Isle), and District III (near Hinckley).

The Mille Lacs Band is one of six members of the federally recognized Minnesota Chippewa Tribe, which they organized in 1934. The other members are the White Earth Band, Leech Lake Band, Grand Portage Band, Bois Forte Band, and Fond du Lac Band.  "Chippewa," is a term commonly used in the United States to refer to Ojibwe people; the Mille Lacs Band prefers the term "Ojibwe," which is also more common in Canada.

Clans
There are eight major doodem (or clan) types found among the Mille Lacs Band of Ojibwe.  They are Bizhiw (Lynx), Makwa (Bear), Waabizheshi (Marten) Awaazisii (Bullhead), Ma'iingan (Wolf), Migizi (Bald Eagle), Name (Sturgeon) and Moozens (Little Moose).

The historical Mille Lacs Band of Mdewakanton Dakota was part of the historical Mille Lacs Indians. The Snake River Band of Isanti Dakota became part of the historical St. Croix Band of Lake Superior Chippewa, which is today known as the St. Croix Chippewa Indians of Minnesota. Due to some of these Dakota ancestry, Mille Lacs Band of Ojibwe have a high degree of Ma'iingan-doodem members.

History

According to oral traditions, the Ojibwe, part of the Algonquian languages-speaking peoples, coalesced on the Atlantic coast of North America. About 500 years ago, the ancestors of the Mille Lacs Band of Ojibwe began migrating west. This tradition has been confirmed by linguistic and archeological evidence.

After driving previously settled Dakota villagers from the area in the mid-1700s, the Ojibwe had become established in the region around Mille Lacs Lake in what is today East Central Minnesota. They had a varied diet based on the resources of the area and hunted deer, bear, moose, waterfowl, and small game; fished the area's lakes and streams; gathered wild rice, maple sugar, nuts and berries; and cultivated some plants.

Europeans started arriving, among them French, British and American fur traders.  Some European colonists stayed and began to compete with the Mille Lacs Band for resources and to encroach on their land. Such settlers continued to violate the treaties and agreements which the Mille Lacs Band made with the United States and British representatives over the decades.

The Ojibwe also suffered because of new infectious diseases, which killed many. By the end of the nineteenth century, only a few hundred Ojibwe remained on the Mille Lacs Indian Reservation. At that time, pressing for assimilation, the United States government prohibited the Ojibwe from practicing their religion (many had converted to Catholicism but still combined it with traditional prayers and rituals), tried to have their children sent to boarding schools at which they were forced to learn and speak English, and virtually denied their right to govern themselves. Their traditional way of life was nearly impossible to follow.

When the Sioux hostilities broke out in 1862 Chief Hole in the Day made threats to take the north to war too.  Chief Mou-zoo-mau-nee of the Mille Lacs Band sent 300 warriors to the Fort Ripley to aid in its defense.  On September 8, 1862  a Mille Lacs Band Chief with 75 warriors was met and stopped at Watab, Minnesota just north of St Cloud, Minnesota.  They wanted to join the government forces fighting the Sioux.  Fort Ripley was informed and Capt. Hall invited the Chippewa to come to the fort as guests of the State to await a decision on their offer.  The week before the Fond Du Lac band sent a letter to Gov. Ramsey to forward to president Lincoln offering to fight the Sioux.  In 1863 and 1864 the Mille Lacs Band signed two treaties that acknowledged their actions and made the tribe "un-removable" from their reservation as well as made the reservation boundaries permanent.   The State erected a large monument to the Chief and the Mille Lacs band at Fort Ridgely cemetery in 1914 for their service to the State.   

Over the next century, Ojibwe bands in the Mille Lacs region struggled with poverty and despair. With the passage of the 1934 Indian Reorganization Act, the bands of the Mille Lacs region joined five others in forming the Minnesota Chippewa Tribe, organized 1934-1936. The four historical bands in the Mille Lacs region (Mille Lacs Indians, Sandy Lake Band, Rice Lake Band of Mississippi Chippewa, and Snake and Kettle River Bands of St. Croix Chippewa Indians of Minnesota) were reorganized as the Mille Lacs Band of Ojibwe.

In the early 1990s, the Band opened Grand Casino Mille Lacs and Grand Casino Hinckley. Since then, casino revenues have allowed the Mille Lacs Band to strengthen its cultural identity, return to economic self-sufficiency, rebuild its reservation, and increase the prosperity of the entire region.

Tribal government
The Mille Lacs Band has a separation-of-powers form of government, making it one of the few Native American governments with three branches of government, similar to the government structure of the United States.

Executive branch
The current Chief Executive of the Mille Lacs Band of Ojibwe is Melanie Benjamin.

The Chief Executive, who is elected by Band members every four years, is the head of the executive branch. She appoints commissioners who are ratified by the Band Assembly to oversee the various departments in the executive branch. 

 Department of Justice, headed by the Solicitor General
 Office of the Solicitor General
 Office of Public Safety
 Canine Registration
 Child Passenger Safety Seat Program
 Emergency Management
 Project Jumpstart
 Motor Vehicle Licensing
 Tribal Police Department
 Tribal Conservation Enforcement
 Band-member Legal Aid
 Administration Department, headed by the Commissioner of Administration
 Aanji-Bimaadizing
 Career Development and Training
 Adult and Youth Support Services
 Gotaamigozi Flex Labor
 Tribal Employment Rights Office (TERO)
 Veterans and Veteran families Services
 WiiDu Youth Activities
 Youth Career and Work Exploration
 Child Support Enforcement Program
 Facilities
 Neyaashiing Community Center
 [new] Community Center 
 Chi-minising Community Center
 Minisinaakwaang Community Center
 Aazhoomog Community Center
 Meshakwad Community Center at Gaa-zhiigwanaabikokaag
 Urban Office
 Grants Management
 Human Resources
 Information Services
 Notary Services
 Self-Governance
 Department of Community Development, headed by the Commissioner of Community Development
 Facilities Maintenance
 Housing Department
 Housing Loans
 Housing Maintenance
 Resident Services
 Project Management
 Public Works Department
 Planning and Zoning
 Roads
 Sanitation
 Water and Sewer
 Corporate Commission, headed by the Commissioner of Corporate Affairs
 Corporate Ventures
 Maadaadizi Investments
 Philanthropy
 Adopt-a-School Program
 Donation
 Wewinabi, Inc.
 Department of Health and Human Services, headed by the Commissioner of Health and Human Services
 Ne-Ia-Shing Clinic 
 District II Clinic Services
 Aazhoomog Clinic
 Public Health Department
 Behavioral Health Services
 Family Services
 Community Support Services
 Department of Natural Resources, headed by the Commissioner of Natural Resources
 Office of Natural Resource Management
 Agriculture
 Community Gardens
 Wildrice Management
 Land Management
 Resource Management
 Fisheries
 Forestry
 Licensing and Permitting
 Wildland Maintenance
 Office of the Environment
 Air
 Brownfield
 Energy and Eco-systems
 General Environmental Assistance
 Water and Septic
 Office of Culture
 Cultural Resources
 Enrollments
 Tribal Historic Preservation Office
 Department of Education, headed by the Commissioner of Education
 Nay Ah Shing School
 Nay Ah Shing Lower School (Abinoojiiyag)
 Nay Ah Shing Upper School
 Pine Grove Leadership Academy
 Minisinaakwaang Leadership Academy
 Wewinabi Early Education
 District I Cultural Immersion Program 
 District II East Lake Education Program
 District III Aazhoomog Education Outreach Program
 Community Youth Services
 Higher Education
 Library

Legislative branch
The legislative branch of the Band’s government, known as the Band Assembly, consists of one Representative from each of the reservation’s three districts and a Secretary/Treasurer who presides over the Band Assembly as its Speaker.  Each Representative is elected by the people of his or her district to serve a four-year term in the Band Assembly.  Band members who live off the reservation select a home district and vote only for a Representative from that district. The Secretary/Treasurer is elected by all Band members.

The current Secretary/Treasurer of the Mille Lacs Band of Ojibwe is Sheldon Boyd, Speaker of the Band Assembly elected in April 2018.

 Band Assembly
 Legislative Administration
 Office of Budget and Management, headed by the Commissioner of Finance, appointed by Band Assembly
 Employee Payroll Services
 Insurance Services
 Revolving Loan Fund
 Burial Insurance
 Discretionary Loans

Judicial branch
The Chief Justice of the Mille Lacs Band of Ojibwe is Rayna Mattinas.  The judicial branch includes the Chief Justice and the Court of Central Jurisdiction, which consists of three appellate justices and one district judge.

 Tribal Court
 District Court Liaison Services

Independent Agencies
 Department of Athletic Regulation
 Gaming Regulatory Authority (GRA)
 Office of Gaming Regulations & Compliance
 Charitable Gaming
 Compliance
 Internal Audit
 Licensing/Exclusions
 Surveillance
 Vendor Licensing

Corporate Ventures Holdings
 Gaming
 Grand Casino Hinckley, Hinckley, Minnesota
 Grand Casino Mille Lacs, Vineland, Minnesota
 Hospitality
 DoubleTree by Hilton Downtown Saint Paul, St. Paul, Minnesota
 DoubleTree by Hilton Minneapolis Park Place, St. Louis Park, Minnesota
 Embassy Suites Will Rogers Airport Hotel, Oklahoma City, Oklahoma
 InterContinental Saint Paul Riverfront, St. Paul, Minnesota
 Marketing & Technology
 Foxtrot Marketing Group
 Sweetgrass Media
 Maadaadizi Investments
 Makwa Global, LLC, Minneapolis, Minnesota (with offices in Onamia, Minnesota; Reston, Virginia; Hawaii; Germany; Nairobi, Kenya; and Dubai, UAE)
 Wewinabi, Inc. (Local Businesses)
 Big Sandy Lodge & Resort, Libby, Minnesota
 Crossroads Convenience Store, Lake Lena, Minnesota
 East Lake Convenience Store, East Lake, Minnesota
 Grand Makwa Cinema, Vineland, Minnesota
 Grand Market, Vineland, Minnesota
 Grindstone Laundry, Hinckley, Minnesota
 Hinckley Medical Office Building, Hinckley, Minnesota
 Lady Luck Estates, Hinckley, Minnesota 
 Mille Lacs Super Stop, Onamia, Minnesota
 Taco John’s franchise at Mille Lacs Super Stop
 Mille Lacs Wastewater Management, Vineland, Minnesota
 Garrison, Kathio, West Mille Lacs Lake Sanitary District (in cooperation with City of Garrison, Minnesota and Kathio Township)
 Red Willow Estates, Onamia, Minnesota
 Woodlands National Bank, Onamia, Minnesota (with branches in Cloquet, Minnesota; Hinckley, Minnesota; Minneapolis Minnesota; Sturgeon Lake, Minnesota, Vineland, Minnesota; and Zimmerman, Minnesota)

List of Mille Lacs Band of Ojibwe Chiefs

Chairman
1936–1940: Fred Sam
1940–1948: Sam Yankee
1948–1956: Fred Jones
1956–1960: Jerry Martin
1960–1972: Sam Yankee
1972–1991: Arthur Gahbow
1991–1992: Marge Anderson (interim appointment)

Chief Executive
1992–2000: Marge Anderson
2000–2008: Melanie Benjamin
2008–2009: Herbert Weyaus (interim appointment)
2009–2012: Marge Anderson
2012–present: Melanie Benjamin

Notable members
 Marge Anderson
 James Clark, Naawigiizis
 Lucy Clark
 Marvin Eagle
 Arthur Gahbow / Wewinabi ("Waywinabe")
 Virgil Hill, boxer
 Maude Kegg / Naawakamigookwe
 Larry Smallwood / Amikogaabaw
 Sam Yankee / Eshpan ("Ayshpun")

See also
Minnesota Chippewa Tribe
Minnesota Indian Affairs Council
United States v. Mille Lac Band of Chippewa Indians, 
Minnesota v. Mille Lacs Band of Chippewa Indians,

References

 Buffalohead, Roger and Priscilla Buffalohead.  Against the Tide of American History: The Story of Mille Lacs Anishinabe.  Minnesota Chippewa Tribe (Cass Lake, MN: 1985).
A Comprehensive Guide to The Mille Lacs Band of Ojibwe Government.  Mille Lacs Band of Ojibwe General Assembly (Vineland, MN: 1996).
 Minnesota Indian Affairs Council
 Aaniin Ekidong: Ojibwe Vocabulary Project. St. Paul: Minnesota Humanities Center, 2009.
 Treuer, Anton. Ojibwe in Minnesota St. Paul: Minnesota Historical Society Press, 2010.
 Treuer, Anton. Living Our Language: Ojibwe Tales & Oral Histories St. Paul: Minnesota Historical Society Press, 2001.

External links
 Mille Lacs Band of Ojibwe, official website
Tribal Register of Band Statues, Ordinances, Resolutions, Orders, Policy and Rules
 Ojibwe Inaajimowin, the monthly newspaper of the Mille Lacs Band of Ojibwe
 Minnesota Chippewa Tribe's Charter for the Mille Lacs Band of Chippewa Indians
 Eni–gikendaasoyang ("Moving Towards Knowledge Together"), Center for Indigenous Knowledge and Language Revitalization], University of Minnesota
Mille Lacs Indian Museum Historic Site

 
Ojibwe governments
Native American tribes in Minnesota